Mesodiphlebia stricticostella is a species of snout moth. It was described by Émile Louis Ragonot in 1887 and is known from northern Nigeria.

References

Moths described in 1887
Anerastiini